Cabuérniga is a municipality located in the autonomous community of Cantabria, Spain. According to the 2007 census, the city has a population of 999 inhabitants. Its capital is Valle.

One of its villages, Carmona, is listed as one of the most beautiful villages in Spain

Notable people 

 Manuel Llano (1898 - 1938). Writer and poet.
 Augusto González de Linares (1845 - 1904). Geologist.

Gallery

References

External links 
Cabuérniga - Cantabria 102 Municipios

Municipalities in Cantabria